Kenny Elders (born 1 February 1995) is a Dutch football player who most recently played for Dutch Tweede Divisie side FC Lienden.

Club career
He came through the NEC youth set-up before joining Achilles '29 and made his professional debut in the Eerste Divisie for Achilles '29 on 7 August 2015 in a game against Jong Ajax. After the club was relegated to the Tweede Divisie in 2017, Elders left them for FC Lienden. He left Lienden again at the end of 2018.

At the end of 2019 it was confirmed, that Eldars would join VV DUNO from 2020.

References

External links
 

1995 births
Living people
People from Boxmeer
Association football fullbacks
Dutch footballers
NEC Nijmegen players
Achilles '29 players
FC Lienden players
VV DUNO players
Eerste Divisie players
Footballers from North Brabant